Wrightsville, Ohio, may refer to:

 Wrightsville, Adams County, Ohio
 Wrightsville, Madison County, Ohio